RC Vyškov (known as JIMI RC Vyškov for sponsorship reasons) is a Czech rugby club in Vyškov. They currently play in the KB Extraliga.

History
The club was founded in 1952.

They undertook their first overseas tour to France in 1967.

The club won their first championship in 1974, beating Říčany 15-0 in the final. This turned out to be the start of a phenomenally successful era for the club, which saw them winning the next seven championship titles. The success of the senior team pretty much filtered through to the youth teams as well in those years.

In 1995 the club experienced tragedy when they lost one of their own. Jan Navrátil, former international prop and their coach at the time, rescued two men rendered unconscious from a resulting gas leak, while trying to repair some freezing equipment in the cellar of the clubhouse. Navrátil subsequently died from gas poisoning and was posthumously awarded a Fair Play Award by the Czech Olympic Committee. The club also named their home ground in his memory.

Honours
 Czechoslovak Championships
 1974, 1975, 1976, 1977, 1978, 1979, 1980, 1981, 1985, 1989, 1991
 KB Extraliga
 1993, 1994, 2016

References

External links
 RC Vyškov
  80 let Českého Ragby (80 years of Czech Rugby)

Czech rugby union teams
Rugby clubs established in 1952
Vyškov